Richard Webster (born 9 July 1967) is a Welsh former dual-code international rugby union and rugby league footballer who played in the 1980s and 1990s, and coached rugby union in the 2010s. In 1993 he toured New Zealand with the British & Irish Lions rugby union team and at the time played club rugby for Swansea RFC. In 1995 he switched to rugby league to play  for Salford Reds, and appeared in the 1995 Rugby League World Cup. In 1996 he returned to union and signed for Bath Rugby. At Bath he started in the victorious 1998 Heineken Cup Final as they defeated Brive.

In 2011 Webster was appointed head coach of the Wales national under-20 rugby union team following the departure of Darren Edwards.

References

External links

1967 births
Living people
Bath Rugby players
British & Irish Lions rugby union players from Wales
Dual-code rugby internationals
Rugby union flankers
Rugby league players from Swansea
Rugby union players from Swansea
Salford Red Devils players
Swansea RFC players
Wales international rugby union players
Wales national rugby league team players
Welsh rugby league players
Welsh rugby union coaches
Welsh rugby union players